Leo Barnes, also known as The Sergeant, is a fictional character in The Purge film series. The character is portrayed by Frank Grillo in The Purge: Anarchy (2014) and in The Purge: Election Year (2016).

Character biography

The Purge: Anarchy
Several months before events of Anarchy, Warren Grass, while drunk driving, kills Nicholas (whose name is mentioned in the film), the son of Leo Barnes, a Los Angeles Police Department sergeant. Grass was charged with driving under the influence, but is acquitted on legal technicalities. An enraged and bereaved Barnes seeks to avenge his son's death and comes up with a plan to do it on the next annual Purge.

In the year 2023, one year after the events of the first film, prior to the seventh annual nationwide Purge, a Los Angeles-based anti-Purge group headed by Carmelo Johns and his partner, the Stranger from the first film named Dante Bishop (Edwin Hodge), hack into satellite feeds to denounce the New Founding Fathers.

Leo Barnes (who is only identified as the Sergeant throughout the film) is off duty on that day and arms up before the commencement. His ex-wife Janice tries to convince him that purging will not bring their son back. She urges him not to go through with his plans, but Leo goes against her advice. He goes out to the streets armed with one rifle and a few handguns in his modified muscle car.

Upon the Purge's commencement, he continues to drive along Los Angeles. After Eva and Cali's lecherous superintendent Diego is shot to death by a paramilitary platoon led by a purger named "Big Daddy", the two women are forced out of the building by the platoon to a purging truck where Big Daddy awaits. Leo witnesses this and tries to decide if he should rescue them or not. But after seeing the women fight back, he chooses to rescue them. Leo then kills the platoon, wounds Big Daddy, and rescues the women by offering them a ride. As this happens, married couple Shane and Liz, who are being pursued by a masked gang of bikers, stow away in the back of his car. After Leo, Eva, and Cali get into a light argument with Shane and Liz, they find out that they are also seeking shelter from purgers. Joining forces, the group flees just as Big Daddy fires at them, heavily damaging the car.

After Leo's car breaks down, the group is forced to travel on foot. Eva convinces Leo to take them to the apartment of her co-worker Tanya and borrow her car, to which the latter agrees. Navigating the hostile streets and alleyways, they find evidence of Carmelo's Anti-Purge group gaining the upper hand against the purgers and the NFFA. After freeing Shane from a trap and taking guns from an abandoned purging truck, the group heads to the subways, thinking them to be safe. Chaos ensues when a pyrotechnic purging gang invades the subways and sets people on fire. As the group reaches the next station, Liz and Shane fend off the gang. However, Shane is slightly pierced by a bullet but the group manages to escape.

Reaching the flat of Tanya, they realize that a car is not available. Tanya takes the group indoors and offers them dinner and medicines. Later, after Tanya's sister Lorraine murders her for the former's affair with the latter's husband, Leo and his group are captured by the masked biker gang, who take them to a theater where upper-class Purgers bid them for human hunting. In the purging arena, Leo fights back, killing the hunters. The host purger calls for backup wherein security forces swarm the chamber and kill Shane. As Liz mourns his death, the Anti-Purge group, led by Carmelo and Dante, storm the arena and kills more of the purging team. Leo compliments their aid and convinces Liz to join them but the latter chooses to join the Anti-Purge group to avenge Shane's death. Carmelo and Dante tell the group to leave while they aid Liz in their mission. After taking weapons from the dead wealthy purgers, Leo hijacks the host purger's car and threatens her before leaving.

By daybreak, an hour before the annual Purge ends, Leo drives Eva and Cali to a suburban neighborhood where Warren Grass lives. After Leo tells the story of his son's death, he ventures to the Grass household despite Cali's pleas not to give in to revenge. Inside the house, Leo threatens Warren and his wife. He interrogates Warren but later forgives and spares him. A bloodied Leo is shot by Big Daddy as he exits the house. While the latter reprimands Leo for trying to play the hero, while also revealing that the New Founding Fathers have secretly dispatched death squads to increase the body count (because they believe the Purge eliminates too few of the lower class), Warren spots the commotion offscreen and plans to rescue him. Just as Big Daddy is about to kill Leo, Warren appears and kills Big Daddy with a head-shot, as an act of respect and forgiveness to Leo once more in exchange for being spared. After sirens blare to signal the end of the carnage, Warren drives Eva, Cali and Leo to a hospital nearby where they reach just in time and Warren calls for medical personnel to tend to Leo.

The Purge: Election Year
Over the course of seventeen years between the events of Anarchy and Election Year, set in 2040, Leo Barnes is now the chief of security for lawyer-turned-senator Charlie Roan (Elizabeth Mitchell) in Washington D.C., who runs for the presidency with aims to end the Purge after her family was killed (during the events of the first film). Barnes is first seen during a presidential debate where Roan gains a standing ovation after rebutting her rival, NFFA candidate Minister Edwidge Owens, by stating how the Purge only serves to eliminate the poor and benefit the rich and powerful.

On the day before the twenty-third annual nationwide Purge, after the NFFA revokes the rule granting immunity to ranking 10 government officials, Leo urges Roan not to stay in her unsecured home instead of moving to a secure bunker, but Roan refuses. Leo revamps security and has the house re-secured with new barricades (James Sandin's security system) and surrounded by secret service agents and SWAT snipers standing watch outside; his partners, Chief Couper and Eric Busmalis; as well as three more secret service agents partly supervising the event from indoors.

After the Purge commences, Busmalis tells three agents monitoring the indoor parts of the house to take a break and betrays Roan and Leo by signaling to a neo-Nazi/white supremacist paramilitary team headed by Earl Danzinger to storm the house. The team assassinates all the snipers and agents and invades the house. Leo helps Roan escape the household using a hatch, but is wounded in the process by one of Danzinger's men. He detonates a bomb in the house, killing Couper, Busmalis, and a few troops.

A group of Russian "murder tourists" ambushes Leo and Roan while they try to navigate the hostile streets of Washington D.C. to find safer hiding places. Convenience store owners Joe and Marcos spot the group taunting them and eliminate the group, rescuing Leo and Roan. Inside the store, they witness the teenage shoplifters arriving and Joe calls his EMT friend, Laney and her partner Dawn (who are treating a teenage boy named Rondo), for backup. As Leo, Roan, Joe and Marcos position for defense, Laney and Dawn arrive and kill the shoplifters. The group then leaves the store for a safer hideout beneath a hospital protected by anti-Purge rebels led by Dante.

On the way to the hideout, a helicopter piloted by Danzinger ambushes the group; Rondo is killed. The surviving six then seek refuge underneath a highway overpass. Barnes extracts the bullet and discovers that it was a tracking device. After a small confrontation with the Crips gang, Leo asks the gang leader's to dispose of the trace bullet, to which the latter agrees if the group will tend to his injured friend. The Crips plant the bullet in another area to trick the paramilitary forces; when two of Danzinger's ground team members find the bullet, the Crips emerge from hiding and eliminate them.

The six arrive at the hideout, where they meet Bishop, his team, volunteer doctors and nurses administering to wounded Purge victims. Leo converses with Bishop's new partner Angel, but Roan interrupts and spots photos of Owens at the team's command office. She realizes that the team plans to assassinate Owens and tries to dissuade them as she wants a fair win. Leo and Roan are forced to flee as Dawn alerts the entire hideout of death squad forces witnessed by Joe, Marcos and Laney, arriving. As the hideout goes into action, Leo and Roan meet up again with the ambulance. However, before the group can escape the city, Danzinger rams the ambulance and his team abduct Roan, then deliver her to Owens, who is presiding over a midnight Purge mass in an NFFA-captured Catholic cathedral.

The group team up with Bishop and his team and they organize a rescue mission to save Roan. They manage to infiltrate the cathedral through a tunnel system. Barnes and his team eliminate the secret service agents and position on the choir loft when Owens invites high-ranking members of the NFFA to execute Roan with NFFA Chairman Caleb Warrens leading them in the purging. As Warrens starts slitting her throat, Marcos assassinates him, instigating a chaos that signals the rebels to invade the cathedral. As the entire congregation panics and disperses, Leo and his team fire into the fleeing crowd, killing many of them. A second group of NFFA secret service agents arrive to eliminate Leo and his team but Bishop and his team arrives and guns them down. The rebels untie Roan while Bishop captures Owens in the cathedral's crypt and plans to kill him. As Roan protests that he must be spared, Owens goads Bishop to kill him. Bishop spares Owens on the condition that Roan wins the election. Leo knocks Owens out as he, Roan, and the group discovers a large number of bound and gagged Purge mass sacrifices that Owens had stashed in the crypt.

After Bishop and his team is killed by Danzinger when they kill the latter's mercenaries, Barnes and Danzinger engage in a vicious melee fight; Danzinger is killed after Leo stabs him multiple times with knife knuckles. At the crypt, NFFA loyalist Harmon James emerges from hiding and targets the senator after killing a freed Purge victim. Joe manages to kill him with a headshot and Leo appears after James is killed. Before Joe succumbs to his injuries, he tells Lane and Marcos to take care of his store and urges Roan to win.

On Election Day, Roan wins by a landslide, and Leo is made the new Director of the Secret Service. Roan makes her plan to outlaw Purge night as top priority, as dozens of NFFA supporters react to the election results in violent protests.

Future 
In July 2021, DeMonaco confirmed his concept for a sixth Purge film would focus on Leo Barnes, while also incorporating a worldwide Purge, a concept originally developed for a potential third season of The Purge television series.

References

External links
 Leo Barnes on IMDb

Fictional Los Angeles Police Department officers
Fictional police sergeants
Fictional revolutionaries
Fictional Secret Service personnel
The Purge
Fictional boxers
Fictional Brazilian jiu-jitsu practitioners
Fictional Krav Maga practitioners
Fictional eskrimadors